A cooperative (also known as co-operative, co-op, or coop) is "an autonomous association of persons united voluntarily to meet their common economic, social and cultural needs and aspirations through a jointly owned and democratically-controlled enterprise". Cooperatives are democratically controlled by their members, with each member having one vote in electing the board of directors.
Cooperatives may include:

 businesses owned and managed by the people who consume their goods and/or services (a consumer cooperative)
 businesses where producers pool their output for their common benefit (a producer cooperative)
 organizations managed by the people who work there (a worker cooperative)
 businesses where members pool their purchasing power (a purchasing cooperative)
 multi-stakeholder or hybrid cooperatives that share ownership between different stakeholder groups. For example, care cooperatives where ownership is shared between both care-givers and receivers. Stakeholders might also include non-profits or investors.
 second- and third-tier cooperatives whose members are other cooperatives
 platform cooperatives that use a cooperatively owned and governed website, mobile app or a protocol to facilitate the sale of goods and services.

Research published by the Worldwatch Institute found that in 2012 approximately one billion people in 96 countries had become members of at least one cooperative. The turnover of the largest three hundred cooperatives in the world reached $2.2 trillion.

Cooperative businesses are typically more productive and economically resilient than many other forms of enterprise, with twice the number of co-operatives (80%) surviving their first five years compared with other business ownership models (41%) according to data from United Kingdom. The largest worker owned cooperative in the world, the Mondragon Corporation (founded by Catholic priest José María Arizmendiarrieta), has been in continuous operation since 1956.

Cooperatives frequently have social goals, which they aim to accomplish by investing a proportion of trading profits back into their communities. As an example of this, in 2013, retail co-operatives in the UK invested 6.9% of their pre-tax profits in the communities in which they trade as compared with 2.4% for other rival supermarkets.

Since 2002, cooperatives have been distinguishable on the Internet through the use of a .coop domain. In 2014, the International Co-operative Alliance (ICA) introduced the Cooperative Marque, meaning ICA cooperatives and WOCCU credit unions can also be identified through a coop ethical consumerism label.

Origins and history 

Cooperation dates back as far as human beings have been organizing for mutual benefits. Tribes were organized as cooperative structures, allocating jobs and resources among each other, only trading with the external communities. In alpine environments, trade could only be maintained in organized cooperatives to achieve a useful condition of artificial roads such as Viamala in 1472. Pre-industrial Europe is home to the first cooperatives from an industrial context. The roots of the cooperative movement can be traced to multiple influences and extend worldwide. In the English-speaking world, post-feudal forms of cooperation between workers and owners that are expressed today as "profit sharing" and "surplus sharing" arrangements existed as far back as 1795. The key ideological influence on the Anglosphere branch of the cooperative movement, however, was a rejection of the charity principles that underpinned welfare reforms when the British government radically revised its Poor Laws in 1834. As both state and church institutions began to routinely distinguish between the 'deserving' and 'undeserving' poor, a movement of friendly societies grew throughout the British Empire based on the principle of mutuality, committed to self-help in the welfare of working people.

In 1761, the Fenwick Weavers' Society was formed in Fenwick, East Ayrshire, Scotland to sell discounted oatmeal to local workers. Its services expanded to include assistance with savings and loans, emigration and education. In 1810, Welsh social reformer Robert Owen, from Newtown in mid-Wales, and his partners purchased the New Lanark mill from Owen's father-in-law, David Dale, and proceeded to introduce better labour standards, including discounted retail shops where profits were passed on to his employees. Owen left New Lanark to pursue other forms of cooperative organization and develop coop ideas through writing and lecture. Cooperative communities were set up in Glasgow, Indiana and Hampshire, although ultimately unsuccessful. In 1828, William King set up a newspaper, The Cooperator, to promote Owen's thinking, having already set up a cooperative store in Brighton.

Also in 1810, Rev. Henry Duncan of the Ruthwell Presbyterian Church in Dumfriesshire, Scotland founded a friendly society to create a cooperative depository institution at which his poorest parishioners could hold savings accounts accruing interest for sickness and old-age, which was the first established savings bank that would be merged into the Trustee Savings Bank between 1970 and 1985. The Rochdale Society of Equitable Pioneers, founded in 1844, is usually considered the first successful cooperative enterprise, used as a model for modern coops, following the 'Rochdale Principles'. A group of 28 weavers and other artisans in Rochdale, England set up the society to open their own store selling food items they could not otherwise afford. Within ten years there were over a thousand cooperative societies in the United Kingdom.

"Spolok Gazdovský" (The Association of Administrators or The Association of Farmers) founded in 1845 by Samuel Jurkovič, was the first cooperative in Europe (Credit union). The cooperative provided a cheap loan from funds generated by regular savings for members of the cooperative. Members of cooperative had to commit to a moral life and had to plant two trees in a public place every year. Despite the short duration of its existence, until 1851, it thus formed the basis of the cooperative movement in Slovakia. Slovak national thinker Ľudovít Štúr said about the association: "We would very much like such excellent constitutions to be established throughout our region. They would help to rescue people from evil and misery. A beautiful, great idea, a beautiful excellent constitution!"

Other events such as the founding of a friendly society by the Tolpuddle Martyrs in 1832 were key occasions in the creation of organized labor and consumer movements.

Friendly Societies established forums through which one member, one vote was practiced in organisation decision-making. The principles challenged the idea that a person should be an owner of property before being granted a political voice. Throughout the second half of the nineteenth century (and then repeatedly every twenty years or so) there was a surge in the number of cooperative organisations, both in commercial practice and civil society, operating to advance democracy and universal suffrage as a political principle. Friendly Societies and consumer cooperatives became the dominant form of organization amongst working people in Anglosphere industrial societies prior to the rise of trade unions and industrial factories. Weinbren reports that by the end of the 19th century, over 80% of British working age men and 90% of Australian working age men were members of one or more Friendly Society.

From the mid-nineteenth century, mutual organisations embraced these ideas in economic enterprises, firstly amongst tradespeople, and later in cooperative stores, educational institutes, financial institutions and industrial enterprises. The common thread (enacted in different ways, and subject to the constraints of various systems of national law) is the principle that an enterprise or association should be owned and controlled by the people it serves, and share any surpluses on the basis of each member's cooperative contribution (as a producer, labourer or consumer) rather than their capacity to invest financial capital.

The International Co-operative Alliance was the first international association formed (1895) by the cooperative movement. It includes the World Council of Credit Unions. The International Cooperative Alliance was founded in London, England on 19 August 1895 during the 1st Cooperative Congress. In attendance were delegates from cooperatives from Argentina, Australia, Belgium, England, Denmark, France, Germany, Holland, India, Italy, Switzerland, Serbia, and the US. A second organization formed later in Germany: the International Raiffeisen Union. In the United States, the National Cooperative Business Association (NCBA CLUSA; the abbreviation of the organization retains the initials of its former name, Cooperative League of the USA) serves as the sector's oldest national membership association. It is dedicated to ensuring that cooperative businesses have the same opportunities as other businesses operating in the country and that consumers have access to cooperatives in the marketplace.

In 1945 Artturi Ilmari Virtanen received the Nobel Prize in Chemistry for his invention of the AIV silage. This invention improved milk production and created a method of preserving butter, the AIV salt, which led to increased Finnish butter exports. He had started his career in chemistry in Valio, a cooperative of dairy farmers in which he headed the research department for 50 years and where all his major inventions were first put to practice.

Cooperative banks were first to adopt online banking. Stanford Federal Credit Union was the first financial institution to offer online internet banking services to all of its members in October 1994. In 1996 OP Financial Group, also a cooperative bank, became the second online bank in the world and the first in Europe.

By 2004 a new association focused on worker co-ops was founded, the United States Federation of Worker Cooperatives.

The cooperative movement has been fueled globally by ideas of economic democracy. Economic democracy is a socioeconomic philosophy that suggests an expansion of decision-making power from a small minority of corporate shareholders to a larger majority of public stakeholders. There are many different approaches to thinking about and building economic democracy. Anarchists are committed to libertarian socialism and have focused on local organization, including locally managed cooperatives, linked through confederations of unions, cooperatives and communities. Marxists, who as socialists have likewise held and worked for the goal of democratizing productive and reproductive relationships, often placed a greater strategic emphasis on confronting the larger scales of human organization. As they viewed the capitalist class to be politically, militarily and culturally mobilized for the purpose of maintaining an exploitable working class, they fought in the early 20th century to appropriate from the capitalist class the society's collective political capacity in the form of the state. Though they regard the state as an unnecessarily oppressive institution, Marxists considered appropriating national and international-scale capitalist institutions and resources (such as the state) to be an important first pillar in creating conditions favorable to solidaristic economies. With the declining influence of the USSR after the 1960s, socialist strategies pluralized, though economic democratizers have not as yet established a fundamental challenge to the hegemony of global neoliberal capitalism.

Meaning

Identity

Co-op principles and values 

Many cooperatives follow the seven Rochdale Principles:

Voluntary and open membership
Democratic member control, with each member having one vote.
Economic participation by members
Autonomy and independence
Education, training and information
Cooperation among cooperatives
Concern for community

Co-op Marque and domain 

Since 2002, ICA cooperatives and WOCCU credit unions could be distinguished by use of a .coop domain. In 2014, ICA introduced the Global Cooperative Marque for use by ICAs Cooperative members and by WOCCU's Credit Union members so they can be further identified by their coop ethical consumerism label. The marque is used today by thousands of cooperatives in more than a hundred countries.

The .coop domain and Co-operative Marque were designed as a new symbol of the global cooperative movement and its collective identity in the digital age. The Co-operative Marque and domain is reserved just for co-operatives, credit unions and organisations that support co-operatives; is distinguished by its ethical badge that subscribes to the seven ICA Cooperative Principles and Co-op Values. Co-ops can be identified on the Internet through the use of the .coop suffix of internet addresses. Organizations using .coop domain names must adhere to the basic co-op values.

Cooperatives as legal entities 

A cooperative is a legal entity owned and democratically controlled by its members. Members often have a close association with the enterprise as producers or consumers of its products or services, or as its employees. The legal entities have a range of social characteristics. Membership is open, meaning that anyone who satisfies certain non-discriminatory conditions may join. Economic benefits are distributed proportionally to each member's level of participation in the cooperative, for instance, by a dividend on sales or purchases, rather than according to capital invested. Cooperatives may be classified as either worker, consumer, producer, purchasing or housing cooperatives. They are distinguished from other forms of incorporation in that profit-making or economic stability are balanced by the interests of the community.

There are specific forms of incorporation for cooperatives in some countries, e.g. Finland and Australia. Cooperatives may take the form of companies limited by shares or by guarantee, partnerships or unincorporated associations. In the UK they may also use the industrial and provident society structure. In the US, cooperatives are often organized as non-capital stock corporations under state-specific cooperative laws. Cooperatives often share their earnings with the membership as dividends, which are divided among the members according to their participation in the enterprise, such as patronage, instead of according to the value of their capital shareholdings (as is done by a joint stock company).

Cooperative share capital 
The cooperative share capital or co-operative share capital (in short cooperative capital or co-operative capital) is the form of capital that the cooperative accumulates from the paid participation shares of its members. The total amount of participation shares the paid to the cooperative constitutes the cooperative capital. The co-operative share capital is usually non-withdrawable and indivisible to the cooperative members.

Economic stability 

Capital and the Debt Trap reports that "cooperatives tend to have a longer life than other types of enterprise, and thus a higher level of entrepreneurial sustainability". This resilience has been attributed to how cooperatives share risks and rewards between members, how they harness the ideas of many and how members have a tangible ownership stake in the business. Additionally, "cooperative banks build up counter-cyclical buffers that function well in case of a crisis," and are less likely to lead members and clients towards a debt trap (p. 216). This is explained by their more democratic governance that reduces perverse incentives and subsequent contributions to economic bubbles.

In Europe 
A 2013 report by ILO concluded that cooperative banks outperformed their competitors during the financial crisis of 2007–2008. The cooperative banking sector had 20% market share of the European banking sector, but accounted for only 7 percent of all the write-downs and losses between the third quarter of 2007 and the first quarter of 2011. Cooperative banks were also over-represented in lending to small and medium-sized businesses in all of the 10 countries included in the report.

A 2013 report published by the UK Office for National Statistics showed that in the UK the rate of survival of cooperatives after five years was 80 percent compared with only 41 percent for all other enterprises. A further study found that after ten years 44 percent of cooperatives were still in operation, compared with only 20 percent for all enterprises.

A 2012 report published by The European Confederation of cooperatives and worker-owned enterprises active in industry and services showed that in France and Spain, worker cooperatives and social cooperatives "have been more resilient than conventional enterprises during the economic crisis".

In North America

In the United States of America 

In a 2007 study by the World Council of Credit Unions, the five-year survival rate of cooperatives in the United States was found to be 90% in comparison to 3-5% for traditional businesses. Credit unions, a type of cooperative bank, had five times lower failure rate than other banks during the financial crisis and more than doubled lending to small businesses between 2008 and 2016, from $30 billion to $60 billion, while lending to small businesses overall during the same period declined by around $100 billion. Public trust in credit unions stands at 60%, compared to 30% for big banks and small businesses are five times less likely to be dissatisfied with a credit union than with a big bank.

In Canada 

A 2010 report by the Ministry of Economic Development, Innovation and Export in Québec found the five-year survival rate and ten-year survival rate of cooperatives in Québec to be 62% and 44% respectively compared to 35% and 20% for conventional firms. Another report by the BC-Alberta Social economy Research Alliance found that the three-year survival rate of cooperatives in Alberta to be 81.5% in comparison to 48% for traditional firms. Another report by the aforementioned Research Alliance found that in British Columbia, the five-year survival rates for cooperatives between 2000 and 2010 to be 66.6% in comparison to conventional businesses that had 43% and 39% in the years 1984 and 1993 respectively

Types of cooperatives 

The top 300 largest cooperatives were listed in 2007 by the International Co-operative Alliance. 80% were involved in either agriculture, finance, or retail and more than half were in the United States, Italy, or France.

Consumers' cooperative 

A consumers' cooperative is a business owned by its customers. Members vote on major decisions and elect the board of directors from among their own number. The first of these was set up in 1844 in the North-West of England by 28 weavers who wanted to sell food at a lower price than the local shops.

Retail cooperative 
Retail cooperatives are retailers, such as grocery stores, owned by their customers. They should not be confused with retailers' cooperatives, whose members are retailers rather than consumers. In Denmark, Singapore, Italy, and Finland the company with the largest market share in the grocery store sector is a consumer owned cooperative. In Switzerland both the largest and the second largest retailer are consumer owned cooperatives.

Housing cooperative 

A housing cooperative is a legal mechanism for ownership of housing where residents either own shares (share capital co-op) reflecting their equity in the cooperative's real estate or have membership and occupancy rights in a not-for-profit cooperative (non-share capital co-op), and they underwrite their housing through paying subscriptions or rent.

Housing cooperatives come in three basic equity structures
In market-rate housing cooperatives, members may sell their shares in the cooperative whenever they like for whatever price the market will bear, much like any other residential property. Market-rate co-ops are very common in New York City.
Limited equity housing cooperatives, which are often used by affordable housing developers, allow members to own some equity in their home, but limit the sale price of their membership share to that which they paid.
Group equity or zero-equity housing cooperatives do not allow members to own equity in their residences and often have rental agreements well below market rates.

Members of a building cooperative (in Britain known as a self-build housing cooperative) pool resources to build housing, normally using a high proportion of their own labor. When the building is finished, each member is the sole owner of a homestead, and the cooperative may be dissolved.

This collective effort was at the origin of many of Britain's building societies, which however, developed into "permanent" mutual savings and loan organisations, a term which persisted in some of their names (such as the former Leeds Permanent). Nowadays such self-building may be financed using a step-by-step mortgage which is released in stages as the building is completed. The term may also refer to worker cooperatives in the building trade.

Utility cooperative 

A utility cooperative is a type of consumers' cooperative that is tasked with the delivery of a public utility such as electricity, water or telecommunications services to its members. Profits are either reinvested into infrastructure or distributed to members in the form of "patronage" or "capital credits", which are essentially dividends paid on a member's investment into the cooperative. In the United States, many cooperatives were formed to provide rural electrical and telephone service as part of the New Deal. See Rural Utilities Service.

In the case of electricity, cooperatives are generally either generation and transmission (G&T) co-ops that create and send power via the transmission grid or local distribution co-ops that gather electricity from a variety of sources and send it along to homes and businesses.

In Tanzania, it has been proven that the cooperative method is helpful in water distribution. When the people are involved with their own water, they care more because the quality of their work has a direct effect on the quality of their water.

Credit unions, cooperative banking and cooperative insurance 

Credit unions are cooperative financial institutions owned and controlled by their members. Credit unions provide the same financial services as banks but are considered not-for-profit organizations and adhere to cooperative principles.

Credit unions originated in mid-19th-century Germany through the efforts of pioneers Franz Herman Schulze'Delitzsch and Friedrich Wilhelm Raiffeisen. The concept of financial cooperatives crossed the Atlantic at the turn of the 20th century, when the caisse populaire movement was started by Alphonse Desjardins in Quebec, Canada. In 1900, from his home in Lévis, he opened North America's first credit union, marking the beginning of the Mouvement Desjardins. Eight years later, Desjardins provided guidance for the first credit union in the United States, where there are now about 7,950 active status federally insured credit unions, with almost 90 million members and more than $679 billion on deposit.

Financial cooperatives hold a significant market share in Europe and Latin America, as well as a few countries in Sub-Saharan Africa. They also have a strong presence in Asia, Australia, and the United States. According to the World Council of Credit Unions (WOCCU), there were 68,882 financial cooperatives in 109 countries in 2016, serving more than 235 million members, with total assets exceeding 1.7 trillion dollars. It is worth noting that the WOCCU's data do not include some major financial cooperative networks in Europe, such as Germany, Finland, France, Denmark, and Italy. In many high-income economies, financial cooperatives hold significant market shares of the banking sector.

According to the European Association of Cooperative Banks, the market share of cooperative banks in the Small and Medium Enterprises (SMEs) credit market by the end of 2016 was 37% in Finland, 45% in France, 33% in Germany, 43% in the Netherlands, and 22% in Canada. In Germany, Volksbanken-Raiffeisen banks have a market share of approximately 21% of domestic credit and domestic deposits. In the Netherlands, Rabobank holds 34% of deposits, and in France cooperative banks (Crédit Agricole, Crédit Mutuel and BPCE Group) possess more than 59% of domestic credit and 61% of domestic deposits. In Finland, OP financial group holds 35% and 38% of domestic credit and deposits, respectively, and in Canada, Desjardins holds around 42% of domestic deposits and 22% of domestic credit.

There are many types of cooperative financial institutions with different names across the world, including financial cooperatives ('cooperativa financiera' is the Spanish term used in Latin America), cooperative banks, credit unions, and savings and credit cooperatives ('cooperativa de ahorro y crédito' in Spanish or 'coopérative d’épargne et de credit' in French-speaking countries).

Cooperative banking networks, which were nationalized in Eastern Europe, work now as real cooperative institutions. In Poland, the SKOK (Spółdzielcze Kasy Oszczędnościowo-Kredytowe) network has grown to serve over 1 million members via 13,000 branches, and is larger than the country's largest conventional bank.

In the Scandinavia, there is a clear distinction between mutual savings banks (Sparbank) and true credit unions (Andelsbank).

The oldest cooperative banks in Europe, based on the ideas of Friedrich Raiffeisen, are joined together in the 'Urgenossen'.

Community co-operative
A community cooperative is owned and governed by members of a local geographical community. It is established to meet the community's needs by providing goods or services that are not be available or affordable through traditional market channels. This is distinct from meeting individuals' needs as individuals.

The aim of a community cooperative is often to create a more equitable and sustainable economy that serves the needs of local residents, rather than generating profits for external shareholders. By working together and pooling resources, members can often achieve economies of scale, negotiate better prices, and develop services that better meet the needs of their community. Community cooperatives can also help to build social capital and foster a sense of community ownership and pride. They have been successful vehicles for rural development in the Gaeltacht in Ireland and the Highlands and Islands of Scotland.

Worker cooperative 

A worker cooperative or producer cooperative is a cooperative owned and democratically controlled by its "worker-owners". There are no outside owners in a "pure" workers' cooperative, only the workers own shares of the business, though hybrid forms exist in which consumers, community members or capitalist investors also own some shares. In practice, control by worker-owners may be exercised through individual, collective or majority ownership by the workforce, or the retention of individual, collective or majority voting rights (exercised on a one-member one-vote basis). A worker cooperative, therefore, has the characteristic that the majority of its workforce owns shares, and the majority of shares are owned by the workforce. Membership is not always compulsory for employees, but generally, only employees can become members either directly (as shareholders) or indirectly through membership of a trust that owns the company.

The impact of political ideology on practice constrains the development of cooperatives in different countries. In India, there is a form of workers' cooperative which insists on compulsory membership for all employees and compulsory employment for all members. That is the form of the Indian Coffee Houses. This system was advocated by the Indian communist leader A. K. Gopalan. In places like the UK, common ownership (indivisible collective ownership) was popular in the 1970s. Cooperative Societies only became legal in Britain after the passing of Slaney's Act in 1852. In 1865 there were 651 registered societies with a total membership of well over 200,000. There are now more than 400 worker cooperatives in the UK, Suma Wholefoods being the largest example with a turnover of £24 million.

Business and employment cooperative 
Business and employment cooperatives (BECs) are a subset of worker cooperatives that represent a new approach to providing support to the creation of new businesses.

Like other business creation support schemes, BEC's enable budding entrepreneurs to experiment with their business idea while benefiting from a secure income. The innovation BECs introduce is that once the businesses are established, the entrepreneurs are not forced to leave and set up independently, but can stay and become full members of the cooperative. The micro-enterprises then combine to form one multi-activity enterprise whose members provide a mutually supportive environment for each other.

BECs thus provide budding business people with an easy transition from inactivity to self-employment, but in a collective framework. They open up new horizons for people who have ambition but who lack the skills or confidence needed to set off entirely on their own – or who simply want to carry on an independent economic activity but within a supportive group context.

Purchasing cooperative 

A "purchasing cooperative" is a type of cooperative arrangement, often among businesses, to agree to aggregate demand to get lower prices from selected suppliers. Retailers' cooperatives are a form of purchasing cooperative.

Major purchasing cooperatives include Best Western, ACE Hardware and CCA Global Partners.

Agricultural service cooperatives provide various services to their individual farming members, and to agricultural production cooperatives, where production resources such as land or machinery are pooled and members farm jointly.

Agricultural supply cooperatives aggregate purchases, storage, and distribution of farm inputs for their members. By taking advantage of volume discounts and utilizing other economies of scale, supply cooperatives bring down members' costs. Supply cooperatives may provide seeds, fertilizers, chemicals, fuel, and farm machinery. Some supply cooperatives also operate machinery pools that provide mechanical field services (e.g., plowing, harvesting) to their members. Examples include the American cranberry-and-grapefruit cooperative Ocean Spray, collective farms in socialist states and the kibbutzim in Israel.

Producer cooperative 
Producer cooperatives have producers as their members and provide services involved in moving a product from the point of production to the point of consumption. Unlike worker cooperatives, they allow businesses with multiple employees to join. Agricultural cooperatives and fishery cooperatives are such examples.

Agricultural marketing cooperatives operate a series of interconnected activities involving planning production, growing and harvesting, grading, packing, transport, storage, food processing, distribution and sale. Agricultural marketing cooperatives are often formed to promote specific commodities.

Commercially successful agricultural marketing cooperatives include India's Amul (dairy products), which is the world's largest producer of milk and milk products, Dairy Farmers of America (dairy products) in the United States, and Malaysia's FELDA (palm oil).

Producer cooperatives may also be organized by small businesses for pooling their savings and accessing capital, for acquiring supplies and services, or for marketing products and services.

Producer cooperatives among urban artisans were developed in the mid-19th-century in Germany by Franz Hermann Schulze-Delitzsch, who also promoted changes to the legal system (the Prussian Genossenschaftsgesetz of 1867) that facilitated such cooperatives. At about the same time, Friedrich Wilhelm Raiffeisen developed similar cooperatives among rural people.

Multi-stakeholder cooperatives 
Multi-stakeholder cooperatives include representation from different stakeholder groups, such as both consumers and workers.

Social cooperative 
Cooperatives traditionally combine social benefit interests with capitalistic property-right interests. Cooperatives achieve a mix of social and capital purposes by democratically governing distribution questions by and between equal but not controlling members. Democratic oversight of decisions to equitably distribute assets and other benefits means capital ownership is arranged in a way for social benefit inside the organization. External societal benefit is also encouraged by incorporating the operating-principle of cooperation between co-operatives. In the final year of the 20th century, cooperatives banded together to establish a number of social enterprise agencies that have moved to adopt the multi-stakeholder cooperative model. In the years 1994–2009 the EU and its member nations gradually revised national accounting systems to "make visible" the increasing contribution of social economy organizations.

A particularly successful form of multi-stakeholder cooperative is the Italian "social cooperative", of which some 11,000 exist. "Type A" social cooperatives bring together providers and beneficiaries of a social service as members. "Type B" social cooperatives bring together permanent workers and previously unemployed people who wish to integrate into the labor market. They are legally defined as follows:
no more than 80% of profits may be distributed, interest is limited to the bond rate, and dissolution is altruistic (assets may not be distributed)
the cooperative has legal personality and limited liability
the objective is the general benefit of the community and the social integration of citizens
those of type B integrate disadvantaged people into the labour market. The categories of disadvantage they target may include physical and mental disability, drug and alcohol addiction, developmental disorders and problems with the law. They do not include other factors of disadvantage such as unemployment, race, sexual orientation or abuse.
type A cooperatives provide health, social or educational services
various categories of stakeholder may become members, including paid employees, beneficiaries, volunteers (up to 50% of members), financial investors and public institutions. In type B cooperatives at least 30% of the members must be from the disadvantaged target groups
voting is one person one vote

SCIC 
The SCIC – Société coopérative d'intérêt collective (co-operative society of collective interest) is a type of multi-stakeholder co-operative structure introduced in France in 1982. A SCIC must have at least three different categories of members, including users and employees. Other stakeholder groups that may be represented are volunteers, public authorities and other individual or corporate supporters. Voting is on a ‘one member, one vote’ basis, though voting in colleges is also provided for under certain circumstances.

SCICs must have a ‘general interest’ objective. Public bodies can subscribe for up to 20% of the capital. The status allows an association to convert into a co-operative without having to change its legal form. The relative rigidity of the structure, combined with the government's failure to grant tax relief, has limited its take-up.

Multi-stakeholding in retailing 
Multi-stakeholder co-operatives also exist in the retail sector. An example is Färm, a Belgian wholefood retailing cooperative founded in 2015 which favours organic and local produce. It operates 16 shops, of which 11 are in Brussels.

Categories of members:

The cooperative brings together all the participants in the food chain from farm to fork, represented by six different categories of members:

 A Investors: the people providing the financial means necessary to achieve the enterprise's ambitions, currently four of the project's founders. This category holds 94% of the shares but only exercises 50% of the votes. The board will consider applications from people wishing to invest in excess of €25,000;
 B Managers: the members of Färm's management;
 C Workers: members of staff working at Färm, who currently number 36;
 D Sympathisers: clients and people who want to support the project without having a contractual or commercial relationship with it. Anyone can become part of this category by buying shares worth a minimum of €105 (currently 5 shares of €21), and a maximum of €5,000. As of September 2020 the cooperative was not accepting new members;
 E Suppliers and producers: there is no obligation to hold shares in order to collaborate commercially with Färm, but the enterprise finds it nice that the two groups support each other;
 F Supporters: self-employed people who have opened a store under the Färm brand.

Governance

Each member has one vote. The members elect the board of 10 at the annual general meeting. Each category of members has at least one board member to represent them.

An innovative governance provision ensure that one group of members can dominate the others. In practice board decisions are taken by consensus. In the event of a vote, each director has one vote, and except where the cooperative's registered or internal rules provide otherwise, decisions are taken by simple majority of those present or represented. But in the event of a tie, if the votes of a group of voters all belong to the same category, the votes of the other categories prevail.

To ensure that members are committed to the cooperative's values, vision and objectives, to guarantee its long-term finance and to limit financial speculation, shares are not transferable for a period of four years.

Members receive a 2% discount on purchases.

New generation cooperative 
New generation cooperatives (NGCs) are an adaptation of traditional cooperative structures to modern, capital intensive industries. They are sometimes described as a hybrid between traditional co-ops and limited liability companies or public benefit corporations. They were first developed in California and spread and flourished in the US Mid-West in the 1990s. They are now common in Canada where they operate primarily in agriculture and food services, where their primary purpose is to add value to primary products. For example, producing ethanol from corn, pasta from durum wheat, or gourmet cheese from goat's milk.

Other

Platform cooperative 

A platform cooperative, or platform co-op, is a cooperatively owned, democratically governed business that establishes a computing platform, and uses a protocol, website or mobile app to facilitate the sale of goods and services. Platform cooperatives are an alternative to venture capital-funded platforms insofar as they are owned and governed by those who depend on them most—workers, users, and other relevant stakeholders. Proponents of platform cooperativism claim that, by ensuring the financial and social value of a platform circulate among these participants, platform cooperatives will bring about a more equitable and fair digitally mediated economy in contrast with the extractive models of corporate intermediaries. Platform cooperatives differ from traditional cooperatives not only due to their use of digital technologies, but also by their contribution to the commons for the purpose of fostering an equitable social and economic landscape.

Volunteer cooperative 
A volunteer cooperative is a cooperative that is run by and for a network of volunteers, for the benefit of a defined membership or the general public, to achieve some goal. Depending on the structure, it may be a collective or mutual organization, which is operated according to the principles of cooperative governance. The most basic form of volunteer-run cooperative is a voluntary association. A lodge or social club may be organized on this basis. A volunteer-run co-op is distinguished from a worker cooperative in that the latter is by definition employee-owned, whereas the volunteer cooperative is typically a non-stock corporation, volunteer-run consumer co-op or service organization, in which workers and beneficiaries jointly participate in management decisions and receive discounts on the basis of sweat equity.

Federal or secondary cooperative 

In some cases, cooperative societies find it advantageous to form cooperative federations in which all of the members are themselves cooperatives. Historically, these have predominantly come in the form of cooperative wholesale societies, and cooperative unions. Cooperative federations are a means through which cooperative societies can fulfill the sixth Rochdale Principle, cooperation among cooperatives, with the ICA noting that "Cooperatives serve their members most effectively and strengthen the cooperative movement by working together through local, regional and international structures."

Cooperative union 
A second common form of cooperative federation is a cooperative union, whose objective (according to Gide) is "to develop the spirit of solidarity among societies and... in a word, to exercise the functions of a government whose authority, it is needless to say, is purely moral." Co-operatives UK and the International Cooperative Alliance are examples of such arrangements.

Cooperative political movements 

In some countries with a strong cooperative sector, such as the UK, cooperatives may find it advantageous to form political groupings to represent their interests. The British Co-operative Party, the Canadian Cooperative Commonwealth Federation and United Farmers of Alberta are prime examples of such arrangements.

UK 
The British cooperative movement formed the Co-operative Party in the early 20th century to represent members of consumers' cooperatives in Parliament, which was the first of its kind. The Co-operative Party now has a permanent electoral pact with the Labour Party meaning someone cannot be a member if they support a party other than Labour. Plaid Cymru also run a credit union that is constituted as a co-operative, called the 'Plaid Cymru Credit Union'. UK cooperatives retain a strong market share in food retail, insurance, banking, funeral services, and the travel industry in many parts of the country, although this is still significantly lower than other business models.

Former leader of the British Labour Party Jeremy Corbyn has publicly expressed support for worker cooperatives.

Women in cooperatives 

Since cooperatives are based on values like self-help, democracy, equality, equity, and solidarity, they can play a particularly strong role in empowering women, especially in developing countries. Cooperatives allow women who might have been isolated and working individually to band together and create economies of scale as well as increase their own bargaining power in the market. In statements in advance of International Women's Day in early 2013, President of the International Cooperative Alliance, Dame Pauline Green, said, "Cooperative businesses have done so much to help women onto the ladder of economic activity. With that comes community respect, political legitimacy and influence."

However, despite the supposed democratic structure of cooperatives and the values and benefits shared by members, due to gender norms on the traditional role of women, and other instilled cultural practices that sidestep attempted legal protections, women suffer a disproportionately low representation in cooperative membership around the world. Representation of women through active membership (showing up to meetings and voting), as well as in leadership and managerial positions is even lower.

Cooperatives in popular culture 
, the number of memberships in cooperatives reached one billion, and so the organizational structure and movement has seeped into popular culture.

However, in comparison with the number of co-operatives, they are rarely the subject of literature. Among these, Ken Follett mentions their role in working-class life during the First World War in Fall of Giants (2010), the first volume of his Century Trilogy:
"Where's our mam?"
"Gone down the Co-op for a tin of jam."

The local grocery was a co-operative store, sharing profits among its customers. Such shops were popular in South Wales, although no one knew how to pronounce Co-op, variations ranging from "cop" to "quorp".

Less seriously, in Murder in the Collective, Barbara Wilson sets a murder mystery among radical printing collectives in Seattle, while Frances Madeson's 2007 comic novel Cooperative Village is set in the eponymous housing co-operative in New York.

In the HBO drama television series The Wire, several drug dealers create a democratic alliance called the New Day Co-Op with the interests of cutting back on violence and increasing business.

Co-opoly: The Game of Cooperatives is a popular board game by TESA Collective played around the world that challenges players to work together to start and run a cooperative and overcome major hurdles.

Cooperatives feature prominently in the Martian economy in Kim Stanley Robinson's Mars trilogy and in a speculative future Earth economy in his novel The Ministry for the Future.

See also 

Artist cooperative
Co-determination
Worker representation on corporate boards of directors
Cooperative economics
Collective ownership
Cohousing
Common ownership
Corporatism
Cost the limit of price
Danish cooperative movement
Distributism
Employee stock ownership
Employee stock ownership plan
Friendly society
History of the cooperative movement
Kibbutz
List of co-operative federations
List of cooperatives
Los Horcones (a producer cooperative & Walden Two)
Market socialism
Microfinance / microcredit
Mondragón Cooperative Corporation
Mutual aid
Mutual Ownership Defense Housing Division
Mutualism (economic theory)
Neo-capitalism
Participatory democracy
Participatory economics
Polytechnic University of the Philippines College of Cooperatives and Social Development
Social corporatism
Social ownership
Syndicalism
Socialism
Worker cooperative

References

Bibliography 

 Neoliberal Co-optation of Leading Co-op Organizations, and a Socialist Counter-Politics of Cooperation  (February 2015), Carl Ratner, Monthly Review, Volume 66, Number 9
 Cooperatives On the Path to Socialism?  (February 2015), Peter Marcuse, Monthly Review, Volume 66, Number 9
 

 Armitage, S. (1991) 'Consequences of Mutual Ownership for Building Societies', The Service Industries Journal, October, Vol.11(4): pp. 458–480 (p. 471).
 Birchall, Johnston. "The International Co-operative Movement", 1997
 Brazda, Johann and Schediwy, Robert (eds.) "Consumer Co-operatives in a Changing World"(ICA), 1989
 Bernardi A., Monni S., eds., (2016), "The Co-operative firm – Keywords, Roma: RomaTrE-Press."
 Cooperative League of America. Co-operation 1921–1947
 Cornforth, C. J. et al. Developing Successful Worker Co-ops, London: Sage Publications, 1988.
 Curl, John. "For All The People: Uncovering the Hidden History of Cooperation, Cooperative Movements, and Communalism in America," PM Press, 2009
 Dana, Leo Paul 2010, "Nunavik, Arctic Quebec: Where Co-operatives Supplement Entrepreneurship," Global Business and Economics Review 12 (1/2), January 2010, pp. 42–71.
 Derr, Jascha. The cooperative movement of Brazil and South Africa, 2013
 Emerson, John. "Consider the Collective: More than business as usual"  2005. Article on graphic design and printing cooperatives.
 Gide, Charles. Consumers' Co-operative Societies, 1922
 Holyoake, George Jacob. The History of Co-operation, 1908
 Llewellyn, D. and Holmes, M. (1991) 'In Defence of Mutuality: A Redress to an Emerging Conventional Wisdom', Annals of Public and Co-operative Economics, Vol.62(3): pp. 319–354 (p. 327).
 Masulis, R. (1987) 'Changes in Ownership Structure: Conversions of Mutual Savings and Loans to Stock Charter', Journal of Financial economics, Vol.18: pp. 29–59 (p. 32).
 Paton, R. Reluctant Entrepreneurs, Open University Press, 1989.
 Rasmusen, E. (1988) 'Mutual banks and stock banks', Journal of Law and Economics, October, Vol.31: pp. 395–421 (p. 412).
 Van Deusen, David. (2006) Co-ops: The Changing Face of Employment in the Green Mountains , Z Magazine.
 Vicari S., (2015), "2014 Annual Report on FAO’s projects and activities in support of producer organizations and cooperatives" 
 Vieta, Marco (ed.) "The New Cooperativism" in Affinities: A Journal of Radical Theory, Culture, and Action, Vol. 4, Issue 1, 2010
 Warbasse, James Peter. Cooperative Peace , 1950
 Warbasse, James Peter. Problems Of Cooperation, 1941
 Whyte, W. F. and Whyte, K. K. Making Mondragon, New York: ILR Press/Itchaca, 1991.
 Zeuli, Kimebrly A. and Cropp, Robert. Cooperatives: Principles and practices in the 21st century , 2004
 Understanding Cooperatives, a curriculum on cooperative business for secondary school students.
 India: Re-inventing cooperatives by increasing youth involvement 
 Zvi Galor Production Cooperative – A Tool for National Development in COOP DIALOGUE – An ICA ROAP Journal, vol. 4 No. 1–2 – pp. 13–22 and 17–33.
The Economics of Financial Cooperatives: Income Distribution, Political Economy and Regulation , Amr Khafagy, 2019

External links 

Venezuela's Cooperative Revolution from Dollars & Sense magazine
United Nations 2012 International Year of Cooperatives (IYC) 

Business models
 
Market socialism
Mutualism (movement)
Types of business entity
Types of organization
Private aid programs